The Sault Sainte Marie Border Crossing connects the cities of Sault Ste. Marie, Michigan, and Sault Ste. Marie, Ontario. It is located at the St. Marys River and the Sault Ste. Marie International Bridge. The U.S. Port of Entry was established in 1843 as the cities on each shore of the river grew. Regular ferry service began in 1865, and border inspection services in both the US and Canada were provided at the ferry terminals since the early 1900s. Ferry service ended in 1962 when the International Bridge spanning the river was completed. The adjacent Sault Ste. Marie International Railroad Bridge was built in 1887.

Both the U.S. and Canada border stations are open 24 hours per day. The U.S. replaced its border station in 2011. Canada completed its new $51 million border station in 2017.

See also
 List of Canada–United States border crossings

References 

Canada–United States border crossings
1843 establishments in Michigan